George Costello Wolfe (born September 23, 1954) is an American playwright and director of theater and film. He won a Tony Award in 1993 for directing Angels in America: Millennium Approaches and another Tony Award in 1996 for his direction of the musical Bring in 'da Noise/Bring in 'da Funk. He served as Artistic Director of The Public Theater from 1993 until 2004.

Early life and education
Wolfe was born into an African-American family in Frankfort, Kentucky, the son of Anna (née Lindsey), an educator, and Costello Wolfe, a government clerk.  He attended an all-black public school (a Rosenwald school) where his mother taught. He is interviewed in the documentary film Rosenwald, discussing his time at the school. After a family move, he began attending the integrated Frankfort public schools.

Wolfe attended Frankfort High School where he began to pursue his interest in the theatre arts, and wrote poetry and prose for the school's literary journal. After high school, Wolfe enrolled at Kentucky State University, a historically black college and the alma mater of his parents. Following his first year, he transferred to Pomona College in Claremont, California, where he pursued a BA in theater. Wolfe taught for several years in Los Angeles at the Inner City Cultural Center.

He moved to the East Coast and taught in New York City. In 1983, he earned an MFA in dramatic writing and musical theater at New York University.

Career
In 1977, Wolfe gave C. Bernard Jackson, the executive director of the Inner City Cultural Center in the Los Angeles, the first scene of a play he was working on. Rather than suggest that he finish writing it, Jackson said, "Here's some money, go do it." The name of the play was Tribal Rites, or The Coming of the Great God-bird Nabuku to the Age of Horace Lee Lizer. Wolfe stated in an article he wrote about Jackson for the Los Angeles Times that "this production was perhaps the most crucial to my evolution" as an artist.

Among Wolfe's first major offerings—the musical Paradise (1985) and his play The Colored Museum (1986)--were off-Broadway productions that met with mixed reviews.  In 1990, however, Wolfe won an Obie Award for a best off-Broadway director for his play Spunk, an adaptation of three stories by Zora Neale Hurston.

Wolfe gained a national reputation with his 1991 musical Jelly's Last Jam, a musical about the life of jazz musician Jelly Roll Morton. After a Los Angeles opening, the play moved to Broadway, where it received 11 Tony nominations and won the Drama Desk Award for Outstanding Book of a Musical. Two years later, Wolfe directed Tony Kushner's Angels in America: Millennium Approaches to great critical acclaim, and won a Tony Award.  Wolfe also directed the world premiere of the second part of Angels, entitled Perestroika, the following year.

From 1993 to 2004, Wolfe served as artistic director and producer of the New York Shakespeare Festival/Public Theater. In 1996 he created the musical Bring in 'Da Noise, Bring in 'Da Funk, an ensemble of tap and music starring Savion Glover; the show moved to Broadway's Ambassador Theatre. His work won a second Tony Award for direction and was an enormous financial success.

In 2000, Wolfe co-wrote the book and directed the Broadway production of the musical The Wild Party.

In late 2004, Wolfe announced his intention to leave the theater for film direction, beginning with the well-received HBO film Lackawanna Blues.

Wolfe has also continued to direct plays, such as  Suzan-Lori Parks' Pulitzer Prize-winning play Topdog/Underdog (2001), and Tony Kushner's Caroline, or Change (2003), a through-composed musical. In the summer of 2006, Wolfe directed a new translation of Bertolt Brecht's Mother Courage and Her Children at the time Delacorte Theatre in Central Park, starring  Meryl Streep, Kevin Kline, and Austin Pendleton.

Wolfe directed the film Nights in Rodanthe, starring Richard Gere and Diane Lane, which opened in theaters in September 2008.

Wolfe is bringing his artistic talent to the design of the upcoming Center for Civil & Human Rights in Atlanta as its new chief creative officer.

In 2013, he was inducted into the American Theater Hall of Fame.

In August 2017, Wolfe was the only one of the 17 private members of the President's Committee on the Arts and Humanities who did not sign on to a letter of mass resignation in the wake of Donald Trump's remarks on the Unite the Right rally incident in Charlottesville, Virginia. However, his representatives stated that he, too, would be resigning and would add his name to the letter.

Wolfe directed a Broadway revival of Eugene O'Neill's The Iceman Cometh in 2018, with Denzel Washington starring as Hickey. The production played at the Jacobs Theatre for 14 weeks and began regular performances April 26.

Wolfe is openly gay.

Works

Theater

Filmography

Awards and nominations

References

External links 

 
 
 
 George C. Wolfe in the glbtq Encyclopedia
 George C. Wolfe images

1954 births
Living people
African-American film directors
American theatre directors
20th-century American dramatists and playwrights
African-American dramatists and playwrights
Broadway composers and lyricists
Broadway theatre directors
Broadway theatre producers
Drama Desk Award winners
American gay writers
Artists from Kentucky
LGBT African Americans
LGBT film directors
LGBT theatre directors
People from Frankfort, Kentucky
Pomona College alumni
Tony Award winners
American LGBT dramatists and playwrights
Directors Guild of America Award winners
Tisch School of the Arts alumni
American male dramatists and playwrights
LGBT people from Kentucky
Film directors from Kentucky
20th-century American male writers